Sood or Sud is an Indian surname. Notable people bearing the name Sood include:

Ajay K. Sood, (born 1951), Indian physicist and Padma Shri awardee
Amit Sood, Indian American physician, researcher, writer at Mayo Clinic College of Medicine, Rochester, USA
Anish Sood, (born 1980), Indian musician
Anita Sood, Indian swimmer
Anjali Sud, (born 1983) Indian American businesswoman and CEO of Vimeo
Anupam Sud (born 1944), Indian artist and printmaker
Asmita Sood, (born 1989), Indian model
Bimla Kashyap Sood, (born 1942), Indian politician of the Bharatiya Janata Party, Shimla and member of Rajya Sabha
Chandril Sood, (born 1991), Indian tennis player
Lakshit Sood, (born 1991) Indian tennis player
Man Sood, (1939–2020), Indian cricketer
Manjula Sood, Indian British politician from Leicester, UK and first Asian female Lord Mayor
Manoj Sood, (born 1962), Indian Canadian actor
Neeraj Sood, (born 1969), Indian actor
Pooja Sood, Indian curator, founding member and Director of KHOJ International Artist’s Association
Rakesh Sood (born 1953), IFS 1976, former Indian Ambassador and Special Envoy for Disarmament and Non-proliferation
Rahul Sood (born 1973), Founder of VooDoo PC
Randhir Sud, Indian gastroenterologist and Padma Shri awardee
Ruhila Adatia-Sood, (1982–2013), Indian Kenyan radio host
Sonu Sood (born 1973), Indian actor
Tikshan Sud, (born 1954), Indian politician of the Bharatiya Janata Party, Hoshiarpur, Punjab
Varun Sood (born 1990), Indian cricketer
Veena Sud, Canadian-born, Indian American television writer, director, and producer
Vimla Sood, (born 1922), first woman dentist in India
Vikram Sood, former head of the Research and Analysis Wing, and an advisor to the Observer Research Foundation

See also
Sud (disambiguation)

Indian surnames
Surnames of Indian origin
Punjabi-language surnames
Hindu surnames